Dr. Vartika Nanda is a prison reformer and media educator from India. She is the founder of Tinka Tinka, a movement targeted towards prison reforms. She is recipient of Stree Shakti Puraskar (Rani Gaidinliu Zeliang Award) conferred by President of India, Shri Pranab Mukherjee. This is the highest civilian honour for women in India on women empowerment. This award was given to her in Rashtrapati Bhavan on International Women's Day in 2014 in recognition of her contribution to raising awareness about women's issues through media and literature.  Her work on prison reforms has twice been recognized by Limca Book of Records. She has conceptualised, trained and executed prison radio in District Jail, Agra and in the state of Haryana, India. She is the storyteller and voice behind Kissa Khaki Ka, a podcast series started by Delhi Police. Kissa Khaki Ka has already completed more than 50 episodes since its inception. https://www.theweek.in/wire-updates/national/2023/01/16/des85-dl-podcast-police.html

Currently, she heads the Department for Journalism at Lady Shri Ram College in Delhi University.  She began her career as a journalist with Zee India and rose to become the head of crime beat in NDTV. She was the first female crime reporter on electronic media in India and the first Executive Producer of Lok Sabha TV.

Professional Experience 
With a doctorate in Journalism on the issues of coverage of rape cases by Indian print media, she is currently the head of the Department of Journalism in Lady Shri Ram College of Delhi University. She has taught Television Journalism at Indian Institute of Mass Communication, New Delhi as Associate Professor for three years. She has held various journalistic assignments in electronic media including Zee News, NDTV and Lok Sabha TV. Vartika was the First Executive Producer of Lok Sabha TV and played an instrumental role in the conception, setting up and running of the channel.

Her association with television news started at the age of twelve as the youngest television anchor in Asia.  She is also the Associate Editor of the quarterly journal on media, Communication Today. As a regular columnist, she has contributed to Zee News, News18 Hindi  The Pioneer and Hindi Outlook She was the editor of Gaon ki Selfie, a periodical dedicated to developmental communication, along with well-known bureaucrat Rashmi Singh. She was also the honorary editor of "Media Dunia", a section dedicated to news media industry views and analysis, run by Web Dunia. Web Dunia has the distinction of being the first Hindi web portal in the world.

Media Educator, Trainer and Researcher 
Her research areas include prisons, relationship between police, crime and the persecution of victims, gender reporting and portrayal of women in media. She also specializes in imparting training on crisis communication. Her book Television aur Crime Reporting, published by Rajkamal Prakashan, was given Bhartendu Harish Chandra Award by Information & Broadcasting Ministry (Government of India) in 2007. Testimonial for this book was written by Shri Harivansh, Deputy Chairman, Rajya Sabha

Prison Reformer 
Vartika Nanda is a crusader on prison reforms and the first Indian academician to have started a continuous project solely on prison reforms. She is the founder of Tinka Tinka Foundation, aimed at bringing positive change in the lives of jail inmates. Vartika Nanda is credited to have curated and created the concept of awards for inmates and prison staff for the first time in India. Two national awards exclusively for inmates - Tinka Tinka India Awards and Tinka Tinka Bandini Awards- have been instituted by her as part of the effort. Started in 2015, the award ceremony is organised in a different state every year.

Her name has been included in the Limca Book of Records twice for her unique work on prison reforms.

Tinka Tinka Jail Radio 

Vartika Nanda was instrumental for conceptualizing, training and executing prison radio in the state of Haryana, India. Launched in 2021, Panipat Jail Radio  is the first prison radio of the state, followed  by District Jail, Faridabad and Central Jail, Ambala. 7 radio stations in Haryana are operational. Vartika Nanda has also created, produced and released 6 songs from different jails. BRUT  did a 10 minute long story revolving around reformation of inmates through Tinka Jail Radio in District Jail, Panipat, in January 2022.

She is also playing key role in introducing prison radio in the state of Uttarakhand

Jail Radio in District Jail, Agra in Uttar Pradesh, was conceived and executed by her in 2019. Uttar Pradesh is the largest state in India. Prison Radios have helped inmates immensely, especially during Covid 19.' 

Vartika Nanda has curated Tinka Prison Radio Podcasts, which are the only podcasts in India, solely dedicated to prison reforms. Started in 2020, these podcasts are based on original voices from different prisons. These are scripted and voiced by Vartika Nanda and are broadcast regularly on her You Tube Channel. These exclusive podcasts have already completed 50 episodes since its inception.

 Advisor/ Member 
 2016: Nominated as a member of the Council of MNREGA, Ministry of Rural Development
 2016: Expert on the Evaluation Committee as a member for DD-URDU Channel
 2013: Co-opted on the expert committee on Prasar Bharti constituted by Government of India
 2013: Sole outside expert for the Programme Committee under the chairmanship of DG, Doordarshan to evaluate and examine the feasibility  of the proposal titled ‘ 100 years of Indian Cinema’
 2013 and 2014: In the advisory panel of Ministry of Women and Child Development, Government of India
 2013: Member, Media & Communication Committee for AICTE
 2010: On the boards of various academic institutions, including NCERT (Text Book Committee on Media Studies)https://www.education.gov.in/hi/sites/upload_files/mhrd/files/upload_document/List_of_Econtent_Reviewer.pdf
 2013: Media Advisor to the Crime against Women Cell of Delhi Police

 Awards 
 2014: President of India, Shri Pranab Mukherjee conferred Stree Shakti Puraskar, 2013  Rani Gaidinliu Zeliang Award) to her on International Women's Day at Rashtrapati Bhavan in New Delhi on 8 March 2014. This award was given in recognition for her contribution in creating awareness on women's issues through media and literature. These awards, instituted in 1991, are given to six women every year.
 2015: Included in the Limca Book of Records, 2015, her book, Tinka Tinka Tihar (co-authored with Vimla Mehra, IPS, DG, Delhi Prisons) is the first book of collection of poems written by selected women inmates of Tihar Jail.
 2015: The song, Tinka Tinka Tihar, conceptualized, scripted and directed by Vartika Nanda,  entered into Limca Book of Records in 2017. This is an exclusive musical video showcasing the musical wealth of Tihar inmates. This film was released in Parliament House Chamber by Shrimati Sumitra Mahajan, Speaker, Lok Sabha in May 2015. For the first time, a film of this kind was shot in any prison in India.
 2007: Recipient of Bharatendu Harishchandra Award for 2005 for her book Television aur Apradh Patrakaarita, published by IIMC, New Delhi. Instituted by Ministry of Information and Broadcasting in 1983, these awards are given to promote original writings in Hindi on journalism and mass communication.

 Published Books 
Prison Reforms

 2018: Tinka Tinka Madhya Pradesh, a unique mini coffee table book representing the life in prisons through a creative lens, with 12 male, 2 female inmates and 3 children living in prisons along with a Prahari. This book was released by Shri Kiren Rijuji, then MOS Home, Government of India.
 2016 & 2020Tinka Tinka Dasna, first ever reporting of its kind on jail life. Published in both English and Hindi, the English book has been translated by Dr Nupur Talwar. This book deals with the lives of those who are on life imprisonment. This project also saw the production of the theme song of Dasna Jail, conceptualized, written and directed by Vartika Nanda. This was sung by 13 inmates of the jail.
 2013: Tinka Tinka Tihar, co-authored with Vimlaa Mehra, IPS, first book of collection of poems written by selected women inmates of Tihar Jail; published by Rajkamal Prakashan; released by the Minister of Home Affairs at the APPCA Conference in Vigyan Bhawan in September 2013, 15th edition

Journalism & Mass Communication

 2018: Media aur Bazar, published by Samayik Books	
 2018: Media, Law and Ethics, published by Kanishka Publishers. This book is prescribed in the course of BA (Hons.) Journalism, Delhi University 
 2010: Television aur Crime Reporting, published by Rajkamal Prakashan <ref><//rajkamalprakashan.com/catalogsearch/result/?q=VARTIKA</ref>
 2009: Co-authored a book titled Media aur Jansamvad, published by Samayik Prakashan
 2006: Television aur Apraadh Patrakarita, published by IIMC 

Literature
 2015:Raniyan Sab Janti Hain: This book has poetry dedicated to victims and survivors of different crimes. The book was rated amongst top 5 books by Femina
'2011: 'Thee. Hoon..Rahungi:  first book of collection of poems in India revolving around the issue of crime against women, published by Rajkamal Prakashan, 2011
2011: Marjaanee: Compilation of poetry, published by Rajkamal Prakashan, 2011
 1989:Madhur Dastak: Compilation of poetry, published while in school

References

External links

Indian women television journalists
Indian television journalists
1977 births
Living people
Prison reformers
21st-century Indian women writers
21st-century Indian journalists
Journalists from Punjab, India
Women writers from Punjab, India
Indian writers